Somerdale is a borough in Camden County, in the U.S. state of New Jersey. As of the 2020 United States census, the borough's population was 5,566, an increase of 415 (+8.1%) from the 2010 census count of 5,151, which in turn reflected a decline of 41 (−0.8%) from the 5,192 counted in the 2000 census.

Somerdale was created on April 23, 1929, from portions of Clementon Township, one of seven municipalities created from the now-defunct township, and one of five new municipalities created on the same date: Hi-Nella Borough, Lindenwold Borough, Pine Hill Borough, and Pine Valley Borough created on that same date.

Geography
According to the U.S. Census Bureau, Somerdale had a total area of 1.39 square miles (3.61 km2), all of which was land. 

Somerdale borders the Camden County municipalities of Cherry Hill, Gloucester Township, Hi-Nella, Lawnside, Lindenwold, Magnolia, Stratford, and Voorhees Township.

Demographics

2010 census

The Census Bureau's 2006–2010 American Community Survey showed that (in 2010 inflation-adjusted dollars) median household income was $60,991 (with a margin of error of +/− $10,116) and the median family income was $71,862 (+/− $7,180). Males had a median income of $46,132 (+/− $3,220) versus $32,287 (+/− $3,698) for females. The per capita income for the borough was $26,221 (+/− $2,206). About 2.2% of families and 5.2% of the population were below the poverty line, including 1.8% of those under age 18 and none of those age 65 or over.

2000 census
As of the 2000 U.S. census, there were 5,192 people, 2,068 households, and 1,379 families residing in the borough. The racial makeup of the borough was 75.35% White, 17.66% African American, 0.21% Native American, 3.24% Asian, 0.02% Pacific Islander, 1.08% from other races, and 2.45% from two or more races. Hispanic or Latino of any race were 3.89% of the population.

There were 2,068 households, out of which 27.5% had children under the age of 18 living with them, 48.4% were married couples living together, 12.1% had a female householder with no husband present, and 33.3% were non-families. 29.6% of all households were made up of individuals, and 9.5% had someone living alone who was 65 years of age or older. The average household size was 2.51 and the average family size was 3.11.

The population in Somerdale was spread out, with 22.3% under the age of 18, 7.0% from 18 to 24, 31.3% from 25 to 44, 24.0% from 45 to 64, and 15.4% who were 65 years of age or older. The median age was 39 years. For every 100 females, there were 95.9 males. For every 100 females age 18 and over, there were 94.4 males.

The median income for a household in the borough was $46,898, and the median income for a family was $54,200. Males had a median income of $37,008 versus $31,237 for females. The per capita income for the borough was $21,259. About 6.4% of families and 5.5% of the population were below the poverty line, including 8.4% of those under age 18 and 6.2% of those age 65 or over.

Government

Local government
Somerdale is governed under the Borough form of New Jersey municipal government, which is used in 218 (of the 564) municipalities in the state, making it the most common form of government in New Jersey. The governing body is comprised of the Mayor and the Borough Council, with all positions elected at-large on a partisan basis as part of the November general election. A Mayor is elected directly by the voters to a four-year term of office. The Borough Council is comprised of six members, who are elected to serve three-year terms on a staggered basis, with two seats coming up for election each year in a three-year cycle. The Borough form of government used by Somerdale is a "weak mayor / strong council" government in which council members act as the legislative body with the mayor presiding at meetings and voting only in the event of a tie. The mayor can veto ordinances subject to an override by a two-thirds majority vote of the council. The mayor makes committee and liaison assignments for council members, and most appointments are made by the mayor with the advice and consent of the council.

, the Mayor of Somerdale is Democrat Gary J. Passanante, whose term of office ends December 31, 2023. Members of the Borough Council are Council President David A. Alexander (D, 2022), George Badey (D, 2024), George C. Ehrmann (D, 2024), Edward J. Kain (D, 2022), James J. Perry (D, 2023) and Lawrence R. "Larry" Sefchick (D, 2023).

Federal, state, and county representation
Somerdale is located in the 1st Congressional District and is part of New Jersey's 6th state legislative district. Prior to the 2011 reapportionment following the 2010 Census, Somerdale had been in the 5th state legislative district.

Politics
As of March 2011, there were a total of 3,457 registered voters in Somerdale, of which 1,919 (55.5%) were registered as Democrats, 318 (9.2%) were registered as Republicans and 1,215 (35.1%) were registered as Unaffiliated. There were 5 voters registered as Libertarians or Greens.

In the 2012 presidential election, Democrat Barack Obama received 72.4% of the vote (1,718 cast), ahead of Republican Mitt Romney with 26.8% (635 votes), and other candidates with 0.8% (19 votes), among the 2,383 ballots cast by the borough's 3,747 registered voters (11 ballots were spoiled), for a turnout of 63.6%. In the 2008 presidential election, Democrat Barack Obama received 68.3% of the vote (1,758 cast), ahead of Republican John McCain, who received around 28.5% (734 votes), with 2,573 ballots cast among the borough's 3,437 registered voters, for a turnout of 74.9%. In the 2004 presidential election, Democrat John Kerry received 65.2% of the vote (1,653 ballots cast), outpolling Republican George W. Bush, who received around 33.0% (836 votes), with 2,535 ballots cast among the borough's 3,444 registered voters, for a turnout percentage of 73.6.

In the 2013 gubernatorial election, Republican Chris Christie received 49.2% of the vote (606 cast), ahead of Democrat Barbara Buono with 49.1% (604 votes), and other candidates with 1.7% (21 votes), among the 1,259 ballots cast by the borough's 3,753 registered voters (28 ballots were spoiled), for a turnout of 33.5%. In the 2009 gubernatorial election, Democrat Jon Corzine received 58.8% of the vote (842 ballots cast), ahead of both Republican Chris Christie with 33.6% (481 votes) and Independent Chris Daggett with 4.8% (69 votes), with 1,433 ballots cast among the borough's 3,469 registered voters, yielding a 41.3% turnout.

Education
Somerdale School District serves public school students in pre-kindergarten through eighth grade at Somerdale Park School. As of the 2020–21 school year, the district, comprised of one school, had an enrollment of 461 students and 44.0 classroom teachers (on an FTE basis), for a student–teacher ratio of 10.5:1.

For ninth grade through twelfth grade, public school students attend Sterling High School, a regional high school district that also serves students from Magnolia and Stratford, along with the sending districts of Hi-Nella and Laurel Springs. The high school is located in Somerdale. As of the 2020–21 school year, the high school had an enrollment of 912 students and 69.0 classroom teachers (on an FTE basis), for a student–teacher ratio of 13.2:1. Seats on the district's board of education are allocated based on the population of the constituent municipalities, with three seats assigned to Somerdale.

Our Lady of Grace was a K–8 elementary school that operated under the auspices of the Roman Catholic Diocese of Camden. As part of the reorganization by the Camden Diocese, Our Lady of Grace School and the associated church were both closed, after a November 2009 announcement from the Camden Diocese that the Somerdale church would be one of three churches that would be closed and combined to create Our Lady of Guadalupe Parish in Lindenwold.

Transportation

Roads and highways

U.S. Route 30 traverses the borough, from the border with Magnolia to the north and to Stratford to the south.

Public transportation
NJ Transit bus service between the borough and Philadelphia is available on the 403 route (from Turnersville to Camden), with local service available on the 451.

Notable people

People who were born in, residents of, or otherwise closely associated with Somerdale include:

 Jason Cook (born 1980), television actor and director
 Darryl Dawkins (born 1957), former NBA basketball player
 Zac Gallen (born 1995), MLB baseball pitcher for the Arizona Diamondbacks
 April Holmes (born 1973), paralympic runner who holds the world records at 100, 200 and 400 meters
 Michael Kidd-Gilchrist (born 1993), professional basketball player with the Charlotte Hornets
 Sophia A. Nelson (born 1967), author, political strategist, opinion writer and attorney
 Tim Saunders (born 1962), Philadelphia-based broadcaster, who is the radio announcer for the Philadelphia Flyers

References

External links

 Somerdale municipal website
 Somerdale Park School
 
 School Data for the Somerdale School District, National Center for Education Statistics
 Sterling High School
 

 
1929 establishments in New Jersey
Borough form of New Jersey government
Boroughs in Camden County, New Jersey
Populated places established in 1929